Victoria Provincial Park is a day use park area with a beach located east of Victoria, Prince Edward Island, Canada.  Contrary to the name, it is not a provincial park.

Provincial parks of Prince Edward Island
Parks in Queens County, Prince Edward Island